Bridgeville is an unincorporated community in Muskingum County, in the U.S. state of Ohio.

History
A post office called Bridgeville was established in 1830, and remained in operation until 1900. The community was named for a nearby bridge on the National Road.

References

Unincorporated communities in Muskingum County, Ohio
1830 establishments in Ohio
Populated places established in 1830
Unincorporated communities in Ohio